Nigel Stanton (born 1964), is a male former diver who competed for Great Britain and England.

Diving career
Stanton represented Great Britain at the 1984 Summer Olympics.

He also represented England in both the 3 metres springboard and the 10 metres platform, at the 1982 Commonwealth Games in Brisbane, Queensland, Australia. Four years later he competed again for England in both events, at the 1986 Commonwealth Games in Edinburgh, Scotland.

He was a member of the Beaumont Diving Academy.

References

1964 births
Living people
English male divers
Divers at the 1982 Commonwealth Games
Divers at the 1986 Commonwealth Games
Olympic divers of Great Britain
Divers at the 1984 Summer Olympics
Commonwealth Games competitors for England